Endarasha is a small town in Kenya's former Central Province. It is located in Nyeri County, a county created with Kenya's new (2010) constitution. Endarasha Boy's High School is located there as is a local government clinic. Endarasha lies 2416m above sea level and (0 37E).
It is situated in the continent of Africa in Kenya, Central Province, Nyeri North District, Kieni West division and 35 km North west of Nyeri town. It lies on the foot of the Aberdare ranges and adjacent to the Aberdares National Park. Cool, temperate climate most of the year is experienced. 
Endarasha is surrounded by land ideal for agriculture. Amongst the products from the region are Irish potatoes, cabbage, maize, beans, wheat, bulb onions etc.. Dairy products are also produced.
The school is constructed next to the Endarasha township, along the Mweiga-Watuka road (all weather gravel finish road). Its also surrounded by fairly densely populated villages on all sides.
 
Found here is Aberdare Village House Located in the middle of Endarasha settlement scheme, which is an extended small scale farming area on the slopes of the Aberdares Mountain, with approximate over 100,000 acres, and more than 8,000 families living in the area, extending to the foot of Mt. Kenya.
People here are SMALL SCALE FARMERS who start working in their farms from early morning and continue until late evening. This means you will find most of them are busy during the day. 
The main town in the area is Nyeri Town, formerly a market center for European-ex-pat highlands farmers, now a busy commercial and industrial center and the starting-off point for Aberdare National Park.

Its cemetery attracts visitors to the graves of the famous author and hunter of man-eaters, Jim Corbett, and of founder of the boy Scouts, Robert Baden-Powell, who spent the last years of his life in the cottage on the grounds of the nearby Outspan Hotel, and who once said,"Nearer to Nyeri,nearer to heaven".

References 

Populated places in Central Province (Kenya)